Thawun Gyi (1258 – 1317) was the founder and first ruler of Toungoo (Taungoo), the predecessor state of the Toungoo dynasty of Myanmar. The two-times-great-grandson of King Sithu II founded Toungoo near the end of the Pagan Empire in 1279. He became one of several independent rulers of petty states after the empire's breakup in 1287. He later submitted to Myinsaing, the new power in Upper Burma. Thawun Gyi was assassinated by the men of his younger brother Thawun Nge in 1317.

Early life
Thawun Gyi was the elder son of Thawun Letya, the ex-governor of Kanba Myint and Kya-Khat-Wa-Ya (both in modern Taungoo District). He was born after 1256. According to the regional chronicle Toungoo Yazawin, he was born in Pyu where his father had been placed under house arrest since 1256 by a rival governor from a Mon state to the south, which most likely was Pegu (Bago). The fight between the rival governors took place during a brief interregnum following the death of King Uzana of Pagan (Bagan)  May 1256. At the capital Pagan (Bagan), a power struggle broke out between Crown Prince Thihathu and his half-brother Narathihapate. The court-backed Narathihapate emerged winner by November 1256. Since Thawun Letya remained under house arrest until his death in 1279, he may have backed Thihathu.

At Pyu, Thawun Gyi and his younger brother Thawun Nge grew up listening to their father's constant reminders about their royal descent from King Sithu II of Pagan—the two brothers were two-times-great-grandsons of Sithu II—and their rightful claim to the Kanba Myint region, which was given in fief to their ancestor Ananda Thuriya by Sithu II. Their father died in early 1279. Per Toungoo Yazawin, his last words to his two sons were to reclaim their rightful land.

Ruler of Toungoo
After their father's death, the two sons along with the followers (370 households) left Pyu for the north. They decided to settle at a location, about 55 km from Pyu and about 40 km south of Kanba Myint. It was named Toungoo (Taungoo) ("Hill's Spur") because of its location by the hills in the narrow Sittaung river valley between the Bago Yoma range and southern Shan Hills. The date of foundation was 17 April 1279.

Thawun Gyi by primogeniture became the ruler. He was wary of his ambitious younger brother, who coveted the job, but made him his deputy nonetheless. He also brought in Kayin Ba, a commoner from the nearby Htihlaing village, into his inner circle, appointing him chief of law enforcement. It is not clear if he ever sought or received formal recognition from King Narathihapate. At any rate, within the four years of Toungoo's founding, the kingdom came under the Mongol invasions. By 1287, the country had been broken up into multiple rival centers, with each ruler claiming independence. Thawun Gyi never submitted to King Kyawswa (r. 1289–97), who ruled only around Pagan. He did submit later at an unspecified date to the Myinsaing rulers who by 1310 had reunified Upper Burma. The royal chronicle Hmannan Yazawin lists Toungoo as a tributary state.

Death
Thawun Gyi's end came in 1317. On or right before the beginning of the Buddhist Lent that year (23 June 1317), he was assassinated by the men of Thawun Nge while on his way to the nearby Tayahte Pagoda (modern Myat Saw Nyi-Naung Pagoda) to start his annual pilgrimage. Thawun Nge thought that it was the right time to remove his brother since their overlord King Thihathu of Pinya (not Thihathu of Pagan) was facing a serious rebellion at Sagaing. Thawun Nge's calculation proved right. Although Thihathu managed to send an army led by Crown Prince Uzana to retake Toungoo, Thawun Nge quickly submitted to the Pinya forces, and got to keep the governorship.

Notes

References

Bibliography
 
 
 
 
 

Pagan dynasty
Myinsaing dynasty
Pinya dynasty
1250s births
1317 deaths
13th-century Burmese monarchs
14th-century Burmese monarchs